The Shire of Paroo is a local government area in South West Queensland, Australia. The administrative centre is the town of Cunnamulla.

The region incorporates the towns of Cunnamulla, Yowah, Eulo and Wyandra, with Cunnamulla being the hub of the Shire and is centrally situated on the crossroads of the Balonne and Mitchell Highways. Cunnamulla, meaning “long stretch of water”, gets its name from the picturesque Warrego River which meanders past the town and is a popular spot for fishing and water sports. The Paroo Shire has an ever changing landscape, from the Open Mitchell Grass Flood Plains in the East to the Yowah opal fields where the Yowah Nut is found and the Mulga lands to the West. It is an area rich in history, eco systems, flora and fauna.

The shire is highly regarded by birdwatchers as the diverse eco-systems lend themselves to ideal habitats for many species. Main industries within the Shire are beef, goat, fat lamb, wool, opal mining and tourism. Located in a semi-arid zone, the region has temperatures in summer ranging from 15 degrees to 37 degrees Celsius and winter temperature ranges from 2 to 25 degrees Celsius.

History

Gunya (Kunya, Kunja, Kurnja) is an Australian Aboriginal language spoken by the Gunya people. The Gunya language region includes the landscape within the local government boundaries of the Paroo Shire Council, taking in Cunnamulla and extending north towards Augathella, east towards Bollon and west towards Thargomindah.

Paroo Division was established on 11 November 1879 as one of the original divisions proclaimed under the Divisional Boards Act 1879 with a population of 799.

On 3 June 1880, the western part of the Paroo Division was separated to create the Bulloo Division.

With the passage of the Local Authorities Act 1902, Paroo Division became the Shire of Paroo on 31 March 1903.

In 1924, a new shire hall was being built, but it was wrecked in a violent dust storm on 5 February. However, they were able to straighten and strengthen the building and it was finally opened on 6 December 1924 by the Minister for Public Instruction, Frank Brennan. In 2018, an inspection revealed the foundations of the building had shifted and the building was unsafe; it was demolished in 2019. In 2020, construction commenced on a new civic centre, which was officially opened on 28 April 2021 by the Queensland Deputy General for Local Government, Natalie Wilde, and Paroo Shire Mayor, Suzette Beresford.

Towns and localities
The Shire of Paroo includes the following settlements:

 Barringun
 Cunnamulla
 Coongoola
 Eulo
 Humeburn
 Tuen
 Wyandra
 Yowah

Amenities

The Paroo Shire Council Civic Centre is located on the corner of Stockyard Street and Louise Street in Cunnamulla.
Paroo Shire Council operates public libraries at Cunnamulla, Wyandra and Yowah.

Population of the shire

Chairmen and mayors

 1907: William Duncan Rankin 
 1924: Mr Mackay 
 1927: John Henry Kerr 
1952: Jack Tonkin
 1965–1988: Darby Land
2006: Ian Tonkin 
 2008–2012:  Jo Sheppard
 2012–2020: Lindsay Godfrey
2020–present: Suzette Catherine Beresford

See also
 Koroit opal field

References

Further reading

External links
 

 
Local government areas of Queensland
1879 establishments in Australia